Isaiah 61 is the sixty-first chapter of the Book of Isaiah in the Hebrew Bible or the Old Testament of the Christian Bible. This book contains the prophecies attributed to the prophet Isaiah, and is one of the Books of the Prophets. Chapters 56-66 are often referred to as Trito-Isaiah. In chapters 60–62, "three magnificent chapters", the prophet "hails the rising sun of Jerusalem’s prosperity". The New King James Version sub-titles this chapter "The Good News of Salvation".

Text 
The original text was written in Hebrew language. This chapter is divided into 11 verses.

Textual witnesses
Some early manuscripts containing the text of this chapter in Hebrew are of the Masoretic Text tradition, which includes the Codex Cairensis (895), the Petersburg Codex of the Prophets (916), Aleppo Codex (10th century), Codex Leningradensis (1008).

Fragments containing parts of this chapter were found among the Dead Sea Scrolls (3rd century BC or later): 
 1QIsaa: complete
 1QIsab: extant: verses 1‑2
 4QIsab (4Q56): extant: verses 1‑3
 4QIsah (4Q62): extant: verses 1-2
 4QIsam (4Q66): extant: verses 3-6

There is also a translation into Koine Greek known as the Septuagint, made in the last few centuries BCE. Extant ancient manuscripts of the Septuagint version include Codex Vaticanus (B; B; 4th century), Codex Sinaiticus (S; BHK: S; 4th century), Codex Alexandrinus (A; A; 5th century) and Codex Marchalianus (Q; Q; 6th century).

Parashot
The parashah sections listed here are based on the Aleppo Codex. Isaiah 61 is a part of the Consolations (Isaiah 40–66). {P}: open parashah; {S}: closed parashah.
 {S} 61:1-9 {P} 61:10-11 [62:1-9 {S}]

Verse 1
 The Spirit of the Lord God is upon me;
 because the Lord hath anointed me to preach good tidings unto the meek;
 he hath sent me to bind up the brokenhearted,
 to proclaim liberty to the captives, 
 and the opening of the prison to them that are bound;
Cited in 

Verse 2
 To proclaim the acceptable year of the Lord, 
 and the day of vengeance of our God; 
 to comfort all that mourn;
Cited in 

Verse 4
And they shall build the old wastes, they shall raise up the former desolations, and they shall repair the waste cities, the desolations of many generations.
Cross reference: Isaiah 58:12

See also

Jubilee (biblical) (Hebrew yovel יובל)
Jubilee (Christianity) 
Related Bible parts: Leviticus 25, Psalm 146, Isaiah 58, Ezekiel 46, Luke 4, Revelation 5

References

Sources

External links

Jewish
Isaiah 61 Original Hebrew with Parallel English
Isaiah 61 Hebrew with Rashi's Commentary

Christian
Isaiah 61 English Translation with Parallel Latin Vulgate

61